Theon was a town in Asotin County, Washington.

Established in 1884, Theon was named after Daniel Theon Welch, a local merchant. A post office called Theon operated from 1880 to 1909.

References

Ghost towns in Washington (state)
Geography of Asotin County, Washington